Bullia diluta is a species of sea snail, a marine gastropod mollusk in the family Nassariidae, the Nassa mud snails or dog whelks.

Description

Distribution

References

Nassariidae